Robert E. Donham (October 11, 1926 – September 21, 1983) was an American professional basketball player. Donham was selected in the third round of the 1950 NBA Draft by the Boston Celtics after a collegiate career at Ohio State. In four NBA seasons, all with the Celtics, Donham recorded 1,818 points, 1,071 rebounds and 706 assists.

NBA career statistics

Regular season

Playoffs

References

1926 births
1983 deaths
American men's basketball players
Basketball players from Indiana
Boston Celtics draft picks
Boston Celtics players
Ohio State Buckeyes men's basketball players
Sportspeople from Hammond, Indiana
Shooting guards